Mud Creek is a stream in Callaway County in the U.S. state of Missouri. It is a tributary of Logan Creek.

Mud Creek was so named on account of frequently muddy water.

See also
List of rivers of Missouri

References

Rivers of Callaway County, Missouri
Rivers of Missouri